Addicted to You may refer to:
"Addicted to You" (Alec Empire song)
"Addicted to You" (Anthony Callea song)
"Addicted to You" (Avicii song)
"Addicted to You" (Hikaru Utada song)
"Addicted to You" (Laura Voutilainen song)
"Addicted to You" (LeVert song)
"Addicted to You" (Shakira song)

See also
Addicted to Love (disambiguation)
Addicted (disambiguation)